Alive in Eighty Five — also known as Alive in '85 — is an album by the rock band Kingfish.  It was recorded at Sweetwater in Mill Valley, California in 1985, and released by Relix Records as a vinyl LP later that year.  It was released on CD in 1991.

According to William Rhulmann on AllMusic, the album is "said to have been recorded at the Sweetwater in Mill Valley, California (though it sounds like a studio set)".

Track listing

"Big Boss Man" (Luther Dixon, Al Smith) – 3:37 
"Dancing in the Streets" (Marvin Gaye, Ivy Jo Hunter, William "Mickey" Stevenson) – 4:35 
"Rip It Up" (Robert Blackwell, John Marascalco) – 2:45 
"Holy Cow" (Allen Toussaint) – 3:29
"Rumor at the Honky Tonk" (Barry Flast) – 4:01
"Money Honey" (Jesse Stone) – 3:46
"Statesboro Blues" (Blind Willie McTell) – 3:53
"40 Days and 40 Nights" (Bernard Roth) – 2:24

Personnel

Kingfish
Matthew Kelly – vocals, rhythm guitar, harp, and National steel slide guitar on "40 Days and 40 Nights" and "Statesboro Blues"
Barry Flast – vocals, piano
Robbie Hoddinott – lead guitar
Garth Webber – lead guitar and rhythm guitar on "Dancing in the Streets", "Holy Cow", "Statesboro Blues", and "40 Days and 40 Nights"
Steve Evans – bass
David Perper – drums

Production
Matthew Kelly – producer
Betsey Grey – cover art
Toni Brown – back cover design

Notes

Kingfish (band) albums
1985 live albums
Relix Records live albums